Benjaminas Zelkevičius (born 6 February 1944) is a football coach and a former striker from Lithuania. He is currently the technical director at FM Ateitis. Zelkevičius has been manager of the Lithuania national football team on three separate occasions: from 1990–1991, 1995–1997, and 2001–2002. As player he had played 331 matches for the FK Žalgiris Vilnius (50 goals).

He had coached also FK Žalgiris Vilnius and Russian football club FC Baltika Kaliningrad.

During his playing career, he played for FC Shakhtar Donetsk in the Soviet Top League and for FK Žalgiris Vilnius in the Soviet First League.

Post-managing career
From September 2009 through 2010 Zelkevičius was coaching at FM Ateitis youth academy. On 12 August 2019, he became Ateitis' technical director.

Since 2015, Zelkevičius also is chair of the Lithuanian Football Coaches Council.

Honours
 Baltic Cup
 1991
Champion of Latvia 2005

References

1944 births
Living people
Soviet footballers
Lithuanian footballers
Association football forwards
Soviet Top League players
FK Žalgiris players
FC Shakhtar Donetsk players
FK Žalgiris managers
FK Liepājas Metalurgs managers
Soviet football managers
Lithuanian football managers
Lithuanian expatriate football managers
FC KAMAZ Naberezhnye Chelny managers
FC Shinnik Yaroslavl managers
FC Baltika Kaliningrad managers
FC Luch Vladivostok managers
Russian Premier League managers
Lithuanian expatriate sportspeople in Latvia
Expatriate football managers in Russia
Lithuania national football team managers